Hunter NW5, is a 2,027-metre (6,650-feet) mountain in the Murray Range of the Hart Ranges in Northern British Columbia.  The mountain is within the Pine-Lemoray Provincial Park.
Two-thousanders of British Columbia
Northern Interior of British Columbia
Canadian Rockies